Flucythrinate is a pyrethroid insecticide and acaricide.  It is not currently approved for use in the United States.

References

Pyrethroids